Garbh-Bheinn  (also known as Garven) (808 m), is a mountain in the Cuillin mountains of the Isle of Skye. It is located in the centre of the island, northeast of the main Black Cuillin range.

Part Red Cuillin granite, and part Black Cuillin gabbro, Garbh-bheinn is an excellent peak for straightforward scrambling, and offers fantastic views from its summit. The nearest village is Torrin to the south.

References

Corbetts
Marilyns of Scotland
Mountains and hills of the Isle of Skye